Charlotte "Lotta" Faust (February 8, 1880 – January 25, 1910) was an American actress, dancer, and singer. She performed an interpretation of the Salome dance based on the play Salome (1893) by Oscar Wilde.

Early life
Charlotte Faust was born on February 8, 1880, in Brooklyn, New York, the daughter of Mary Hauff Faust and Frank Faust. Faust attended public schools in Brooklyn. Her first employment was working as a cash girl in a Brooklyn department store. She worked there until she went on stage at the age of 16.

Actress

Her first appearance in theater came in The Sunshine of Paradise Alley (1896), produced by Denman Thompson. In 1900 she appeared in The Belle of Bohemia while in September 1901 she acted the role of Geraldine Fair in The Liberty Belles. The play had nine writers and composers, including Harry B. Smith, the primary librettist. Aine Lauchaume wrote most of the music. It was produced at the Madison Square Theatre, 24th Street, 5th Avenue and Madison Avenue.

She became popular in The Wizard of Oz (1904–1905), in which she sang the Sammy song. After this she joined the company of Joe Weber and appeared in Wonderland (1905). Later she was among the cast of The White Hen (1907), staged by Louis Mann at the Casino Theatre, Broadway at 39th Street.

In 1907 she was in the troupe of Lew Fields in The Girl Behind The Counter (1907–1908), The Mimic World in 1908 and The Midnight Sons in 1909. For the rest of her life she worked with
Fields and in productions of the Shubert Theatre.

Vaudeville

Faust's vaudeville career began at the Casino Theatre with the introduction of a unique cake walk. She teamed with Frank Bernard for this dance in April 1900. In August 1908 she appeared at the Casino Theatre. During an interview she admitted to being unaware of the Biblical story of Salome. Her rendition of the Salome dance came from what she was told regarding the Wilde play.
She said she felt as if she really were the 14-year-old Salome while she was dancing on stage. She experienced both the horror and fascination during her performances. For each appearance Faust danced as if she would never be able to repeat what she was doing.
There were a number of other women who presented their versions of the Salome dance in the same era as Faust. Among these were Eva Tanguay, Vera Olcott, and Gertrude H. Hoffman. Faust eventually was in a vaudeville show which featured her
as a singer.

Marriages
Faust was married twice. Her first husband was Paul Schindler, a musical director, whom she divorced in 1902. In the 1900 census, the couple are listed as living with the Green family as boarders. Her second husband was singer and comedian Richard Ling, who she wed shortly after divorcing her first husband. However, in between marriages Faust conducted affairs with other men. John Barrymore in recalling her is quoted as saying that he "used to grab a lotta back", this when dancing with the actress and because Faust had a penchant for wearing dresses with large open backs.

Death

Faust died in January 1910 at a sanitarium on 33 East 33rd Street in New York City. The cause of death was pneumonia which resulted from
an operation she had several weeks earlier. Just before she became ill, she played a primary role in The Midnight Sons. She sued Ling for divorce a short while before her death.

Faust was engaged to Malcolm A. Strauss, an illustrator, at the time of her death. He resided at 30 West 40th Street, Manhattan. Strauss painted a posthumous portrait of Faust. It was sold and the proceeds given to Faust's parents at a benefit.

See also
Mabel Barrison

References

External links

Lotta Faust New York Public Library Digital Gallery photos (Wayback)
Digital Collections(NY Public Library)

Lotta Faust in The Actors Birthday Book (1908 & 1909 editions) by Johnson Briscoe
Lotta Faust: Broadway Photographs(University of South Carolina)(Wayback)

American stage actresses
American musical theatre actresses
American female dancers
Vaudeville performers
Musicians from Brooklyn
1880 births
1910 deaths
Deaths from pneumonia in New York City
19th-century American women singers
19th-century American singers
Dancers from New York (state)
20th-century American women singers
20th-century American singers
20th-century American dancers